Marcelo Morales (born October 9, 1966) is a former Argentine football player.

Club statistics

References

External links

reds.uijin.com

1966 births
Living people
Argentine footballers
J1 League players
Urawa Red Diamonds players
Argentine expatriate footballers
Expatriate footballers in Japan
People from San Isidro, Buenos Aires
Association football midfielders
Expatriate footballers in Ecuador
Club Atlético Temperley footballers
Club Atlético Independiente footballers
C.S. Emelec footballers
Deportivo Español footballers
Barcelona S.C. footballers
Ferro Carril Oeste footballers
Arsenal de Sarandí footballers
Club Atlético Tigre footballers
Sportspeople from Buenos Aires Province